The Samsung Gear Fit is a fitness wristband made by Samsung Electronics, and forms part of their Samsung Gear family of smartwatch devices. It features a curved AMOLED display. Its design was developed to appeal to people interested in fitness and style.  The included applications facilitate monitoring fitness activities:
Heart Rate sensor
Pedometer 
Exercise Standalone Modes: Running, Walking 
Companion Modes: Cycling, Hiking 
Sleep

Samsung stated that their Gear Fit is the "world's first" wearable device with a curved Super AMOLED touch display. It is smaller and lighter than the Gear 2 and Gear 2 Neo smartwatches, and is focused on health. It features a 1.84-inch Super AMOLED display with a 432x128 pixel resolution. The Gear Fit comes with a pedometer, heart rate monitor, and a sleep monitor.

A 210mAh battery powers the Samsung Gear Fit, which gives a typical usage of 3 to 4 days and up to 5 days with low usage. The watch body measures  and it weighs .

Samsung introduced the Gear Fit to the market on April 11, 2014.

In June 2016, Samsung announced its new Samsung Gear Fit 2. The activity tracker is the follow up to the original Gear Fit, released in 2014. The new wristband has an updated design, built-in GPS, and the ability to automatically recognize certain activities, an increasingly common feature in fitness bands and watches.

References

External links 
 

Samsung wearable devices
Smartwatches
Activity trackers